Monster House is a 2006 American computer-animated haunted house film directed by Gil Kenan in his directorial debut and written by Dan Harmon, Rob Schrab and Pamela Pettler, about a neighborhood being terrorized by a sentient haunted house during Halloween. The film features the voices of Mitchel Musso, Sam Lerner, Spencer Locke, Steve Buscemi, Maggie Gyllenhaal, Kevin James, Nick Cannon, Jason Lee, Fred Willard, Jon Heder, Catherine O'Hara, and Kathleen Turner, as well as human characters being animated using live action motion capture animation, which was previously used in The Polar Express (2004). It was Sony's first computer animated film produced by Sony Pictures Imageworks.

Produced by Robert Zemeckis' ImageMovers, Steven Spielberg's Amblin Entertainment (marking their first theatrically-released fully animated film since Balto) and Relativity Media (their first animated film), the film was released theatrically by Columbia Pictures on July 21, 2006. It received generally positive reviews from critics and grossed $142 million worldwide against a $75 million budget. Monster House received a nomination for the Academy Award for Best Animated Feature, but lost to Happy Feet.

Plot

On October 30, 1983, 12-year-old DJ Walters witnesses elderly Horace Nebbercracker confiscating a little girl's tricycle and scaring her away from his house. DJ has documented many similar incidents at the Nebbercracker house, which is across the street from his own. The same day, DJ's parents leave for a convention, placing him in the care of teenage babysitter Zee. Later, DJ's friend Chowder loses a basketball in Nebbercracker's lawn; the boys try to retrieve it, but Nebbercracker stops them. He appears to suffer a heart attack and is taken away by an ambulance. 

Zee's inebriated boyfriend Bones arrives. He reveals that, many years ago, Nebbercracker stole his kite. Bones also relates rumors that Nebbercracker ate his wife. After Zee throws him out, Bones notices his kite on Nebbercracker's porch, tries to retrieve it, and is devoured by the house. DJ and Chowder are attacked by the house when they investigate; the next day, they save young Jenny Bennett, who is selling Halloween candy, from being eaten by the house. Jenny calls police officers Landers and Lister, but the house stays quiet when the officers arrive, and they dismiss the report.

The trio consults supernatural expert Reginald "Skull" Skulinski, who speculates the house must be a rare monster created by the merging of a human ghost and a man-made object, only unbound when its heart is destroyed. Concluding Nebbercracker has died and possessed the house, the children construct a dummy child, filling it with cough syrup from Chowder's parents' pharmacy. They offer the dummy to the house to eat, hoping to put the house to sleep so they can find its "heart". Landers and Lister arrive and discover the stolen medicine; as they try to arrest the children, the house eats them, the children, the dummy, and the squad car. Separated from the officers, who seem to have vanished, the children explore the sleeping house's basement. They find all the stolen toys, and a shrine to Nebbercracker's wife, Constance the Giantess, whose skeleton is encased in cement. The house awakens and attacks them, but they trigger its gag reflex by grabbing its uvula equivalent, forcing it to vomit them outside.

Nebbercracker returns from the hospital alive, and reveals that Constance is the ghost. When he fell in love with her, she was an unwilling participant in a circus freak show, living in a cage and tormented by people throwing things at her. He helped her escape and married her. On Halloween, during the house's construction, some children threw eggs at her. Frightened and enraged, she grabbed an axe. When Nebbercracker tried to stop her, she stumbled and fell into the unfinished basement to her death, her body accidentally being coated in cement. Nebbercracker finished the house in Constance's memory, but her vengeful ghost merged with it, and she became the Monster House. For the next 45 years, he assumed a hostile demeanor to protect innocent people from her.

DJ convinces Nebbercracker that he needs to let Constance go. Overhearing this, Constance becomes angry, using two trees to lift herself from her foundation and chase the children off. Nebbercracker tries to comfort Constance, and explains everything is for the best, but when she sees he intends to blow her up with dynamite, she attacks him. Chowder uses an excavator to attack Constance and lure her into a pit in a construction site; she falls, but is not destroyed. Jenny lights the dynamite, and DJ swings out on a crane's hook with it, dropping it into the chimney and destroying the house. Finally freed, Constance's ghost dances with her husband for a moment before ascending to the afterlife. Nebbercracker thanks the three children for freeing him and Constance from their suffering. 

That night, the trio and Nebbercracker gather at the house's still-intact basement, returning all the confiscated items. After everyone leaves, Bones emerges from the basement, unharmed, carrying his kite. During the credits, Bones discovers Zee is dating Skull. Meanwhile, everyone else devoured by the house escapes alive.

Voice Cast

 Mitchel Musso as Dustin James "DJ" Walters
 Sam Lerner as Charles "Chowder" 
 Spencer Locke as Jennifer "Jenny" Bennett
 Steve Buscemi as Horace Nebbercracker, Constance's husband
 Maggie Gyllenhaal as Elizabeth "Zee" 
 Kevin James as Police Officer Landers
 Nick Cannon as Police Officer Lister
 Jon Heder as Reginald "Skull" Skulinski
 Jason Lee as Bones
 Catherine O'Hara as Mrs. Walters (credited as "Mom"), DJ's mother
 Fred Willard as Mr. Walters (credited as "Dad"), DJ's father
 Kathleen Turner as Constance "the Giantess" Nebbercracker, Nebbercracker's wife

Production
The film was initially set up at DreamWorks Animation, based on a pitch by newcomer Gil Kenan. Having just finished film school recently, Kenan had been having several meetings with film producers for a while, but he hadn't found any success, with a screenplay based on the Pac-Man video game series going unproduced. After Kenan received Dan Harmon's and Rob Schrab's Monster House screenplay for ImageMovers, Kenan had a meeting with the head of story Bennett Schneir, where he was able to pitch his vision for the film. Schneir worked for Robert Zemeckis as the head of development at ImageMovers, and Kenan had a meeting with Zemeckis quickly thereafter, apparently due to the filmmakers wanting to get a director for the project as fast as they could. Upon impressing Zemeckis with his pitch, Kenan then had a meeting with Steven Spielberg, where he pitched the film to Spielberg in a presentation with some sketches and drawings he had drawn before meeting Zemeckis. By 2004, the studio put the film in turnaround, after which Sony Pictures picked up the project and began production on August 23 of that year.

The original screenplay of Monster House was, in Kenan's words, "absolutely brilliant and laugh-out-loud funny". Due to his experience as a storyteller, Kenan decided to preserve all the characters and the tone from Harmon's and Schrab's story, but added the idea that the titular house was possessed by a soul, leading to the creation of Constance Nebbercracker and the house's backstory. To help him revise the script and introduce Constance and Horace Nebbercracker into the plot, Kenan brought Pamela Pettler after reading her script for Corpse Bride (2005). They worked on the script at her house, and to meet the established deadline, they finished a draft quickly and sent it to Amy Pascal at Columbia Pictures. As work on the screenplay was underway, in a few months of preparation, Kenan had assembled a team of storyboard artists led by Simeon Wilkins in Studio City, Los Angeles to put up rudimentary boards with scratch dialogue and temporal score, with Khang Lee and Chris Appelhans collaborating on paintings for the film.

The film was shot using performance capture, in which the actors performed the characters' movement and lines while linked to sensors, a process pioneered by Zemeckis for his film The Polar Express (2004). Zemeckis was in the process of starting filming on The Polar Express when he met Kenan, who visited the set to see how that film was filmed and discussed with Kenan how they would exactly shoot Monster House, deciding that they should prioritize the story before the filming technology, though Kenan always felt that the story should use animation to create a world with a living house, as he opined that making the house a viable threat and character would better work in an animated setting.

The casting for Monster House was a laborious process, especially for the lead trio, who were portrayed by Mitchel Musso, Sam Lerner and Spencer Locke. Kenan agreed with head of animation Troy Saliba that actors were needed to portray the roles in a believable way. Many of the film's artists interpreted the roles on set and enhanced the lead actors through posed animation that drove the exaggerations of their performances to make them feel subtle and real.

Ed Verreaux served as the production designer of Monster House. To design the neighbourhood where the story takes place, Verreaux realized that the film's setting needed to resemble that of 1980s films, like E.T. the Extra-Terrestrial (1982). During his discussions with Harmon and Schrab, Kenan was told that the film's setting was inspired by that of Wisconsin and Minneapolis. Verreaux and Kenan went together on a scouting trip to design the film's locations, which involved a visit to Universal Studios' backlot, during which they were granted access to the suburban street of The 'Burbs (1989), the neighborhood of the show Desperate Housewives and the house of Psycho (1960).

Monster House was the first animated feature film using the Arnold rendering software (co-developed at Sony Pictures Imageworks), and the first feature film entirely rendered with unbiased, brute-force path tracing.

Years after the film was released, Harmon received a letter from a woman whose 7-year-old daughter was having nightmares due to the film. Harmon wrote back, explaining that the story went the way it did because he had not finished the script when the studio took it, and hired other writers to change it in ways he did not approve of. He further denounced it by stating that Kenan was a hack and called Spielberg a moron (although he later clarified he was just venting, and did not really mean the latter).

Digital 3-D version
As with The Polar Express, a stereoscopic 3-D version of the film was created and had a limited special release in digital 3-D stereo along with the "flat" version.  While The Polar Express was produced for the 3-D IMAX 70mm giant film format, Monster House was released in approximately 200 theaters equipped for new REAL D Cinema digital 3-D stereoscopic projection. The process was not based on film, but was purely digital. Since the original source material was "built" in virtual 3-D, it created a very rich stereoscopic environment. For the film's release, the studio nicknamed it Imageworks 3D.

Reception

Critical response
Review aggregation site Rotten Tomatoes gives the film a 75% approval rating, based on 162 reviews with an average rating of 6.8/10. The site's critical consensus reads, "Monster House welcoms  kids and adults alike into a household full of smart, monstrous fun." On Metacritic the film has a score of 68 out of 100 based on 32 critics, indicating "generally favorable reviews." Audiences polled by CinemaScore gave the film an average grade of "B" on an A+ to F scale.

Roger Ebert gave the film his highest ranking of four stars calling it "one of the most original and exciting animated movies I've seen in a long time" and compared it to the work of Tim Burton. Ian Freer of Empire gave the film 4 out of 5 stars, stating "A kind of Goonies for the Noughties, Monster House is a visually dazzling thrill ride that scales greater heights through its winning characters and poignantly etched emotions. A scary, sharp, funny movie, this is the best kids’ flick of the year so far." Jane Boursaw of Common Sense Media also gave it 4 stars out of 5, saying "This is one of those movies where all the planets align: a top-notch crew (director Gil Kenan; executive producers Steven Spielberg and Robert Zemeckis), memorable voices that fit the characters perfectly; and a great story, ingenious backstory, and twisty-turny ending." Roger Moore of the Orlando Sentinel also gave the film four stars out of five, saying "This Monster House is a real fun house. It's a 3-D animated kids' film built on classic gothic horror lines, a jokey, spooky Goonies for the new millennium." Scott Bowles of USA Today gave the film a positive review, saying that "The movie treats children with respect. Monster pre-teens are sarcastic, think they're smarter than their parents and are going crazy over the opposite sex". Amy Biancolli of the Houston Chronicle wrote, "It's engineered to scare your pants off, split your sides and squeeze your tear ducts into submission." Michael Medved called it "ingenious" and "slick, clever [and] funny" while also cautioning parents about letting small children see it due to its scary and intense nature, adding that a "PG-13 rating would have been more appropriate than its PG rating." A. O. Scott of The New York Times commented, "One of the spooky archetypes of childhood imagination—the dark, mysterious house across the street—is literally brought to life in "Monster House," a marvelously creepy animated feature directed by Gil Kenan."

However, the film was not without its detractors. Frank Lovece of Film Journal International praised director Gil Kenan as "a talent to watch" but berated the "internal logic [that] keeps changing.... D.J.'s parents are away, and the house doesn't turn monstrous in front of his teenage babysitter, Zee. But it does turn monstrous in front of her boyfriend, Bones. It doesn't turn monstrous in front of the town's two cops until, in another scene, it does." In a dismissive review, Todd McCarthy of Variety wrote: "Alert 'Harry Potter' fans will notice the script shamelessly lifts the prime personality traits of J. K. Rowling's three most important young characters for its lead trio: Tall, dark-haired, serious-minded DJ is Harry, semi-dufus Chowder is Ron and their new cohort, smarty-pants prep school redhead Jenny (Spencer Locke), is Hermione.... it is a theme-park ride, with shocks and jolts provided with reliable regularity. Across 90 minutes, however, the experience is desensitizing and dispiriting and far too insistent."

Box office
Monster House opened theatrically on July 21, 2006, alongside Clerks II, Lady in the Water and My Super Ex-Girlfriend, and grossed $22.2 million in its opening weekend, ranking number two at the North American box office behind Pirates of the Caribbean: Dead Man's Chest. The film ended its theatrical run on October 22, 2006, having grossed $73.7 million in North America and $68.2 million overseas for a worldwide total of $141.9 million against a production budget of $75 million.

Awards and nominations

In 2008, the American Film Institute nominated this film for its Top 10 Animation Films list.

Video game

A video game based on the film was released by THQ on July 18, 2006 for the PlayStation 2, Nintendo GameCube, Game Boy Advance and Nintendo DS.

Printed media
A companion comic book was released on June 14, 2006 with the title Monster House. One of the stories was written by Joshua Dysart with a second story written and illustrated by Simeon Wilkins. The comic was focused on the lives of the characters of Bones and Skull. On June 23, 2006, a novelization of the film was released entitled Monster House: There Goes the Neighborhood. It was written by Tom Hughes.

References

 Columbia Pictures press release titled "Monster House: July 21, 2006" (offline)

External links

 
 
 
 
 

2006 films
2006 horror films
2006 computer-animated films
2000s 3D films
2000s monster movies
2000s ghost films
2000s teen horror films
2000s supernatural films
2000s American animated films
American 3D films
American teen films
American computer-animated films
American monster movies
American supernatural films
American haunted house films
ImageMovers films
Amblin Entertainment films
Amblin Entertainment animated films
Relativity Media films
Relativity Media animated films
Columbia Pictures animated films
Columbia Pictures films
American films about Halloween
Films directed by Gil Kenan
Films with screenplays by Pamela Pettler
Films scored by Douglas Pipes
3D animated films
Animated films about children
Films using motion capture
2006 directorial debut films
Films set in Wisconsin
Films set in 1983
American animated horror films
2000s English-language films